The Mirchi Music Award for Male Vocalist of The Year is given yearly by Radio Mirchi as a part of its annual Mirchi Music Awards for Hindi films, to recognise a male vocalist who has delivered an outstanding performance in a film song.

Superlatives

List of winners
 2008 Javed Ali - "Jashn-E-Bahaara" from Jodhaa Akbar
 Karthik - "Behka" from Ghajini
 Javed Ali - "Guzarish" from Ghajini
 Rashid Ali - "Kabhi Kabhi Aditi" from Jaane Tu... Ya Jaane Na
 KK - "Khuda Jaane" from Bachna Ae Haseeno
 A.R Rahman - "Khwaja" from Jodhaa Akbar
 2009 Mohit Chauhan - "Masakali" from Delhi-6
 Shankar Mahadevan - "Sapnon Se Bhare Naina" from Luck By Chance
 Javed Ali & Kailash Kher - "Arziyan" from Delhi-6
 Rahat Fateh Ali Khan - "Ajj Din Chadheya" from Love Aaj Kal
 Shankar Mahadevan - "Tere Naina" from Chandni Chowk To China
 2010 Rahat Fateh Ali Khan - "Tere Mast Mast Do Nain" from Dabangg
 Rahat Fateh Ali Khan & Shankar Mahadevan - "Sajdaa" - My Name is Khan
 Mohit Chauhan - "Pee Loon" from Once Upon A Time In Mumbai
 Aadesh Shrivastava - "Mora Piya" from Raajneeti
 Shankar Mahadevan - "Uff Teri Adaa" from Karthik Calling Karthik
 2011 Kamal Khan - "Ishq Sufiyana" from The Dirty Picture
 Hans Raj Hans - "Ik Tu Hi Tu Hi" from Mausam
 Mohit Chauhan - "Nadaan Parinde" from Rockstar
 Mohit Chauhan - "Sadda Haq" from Rockstar
 Rahat Fateh Ali Khan - "Teri Meri" from Bodyguard
 2012 Sonu Nigam - "Abhi Mujh Mein Kahin" from Agneepath
 Roop Kumar Rathod - "O Saiyyan" from Agneepath
 Rabbi Shergill - "Challa" from Jab Tak Hai Jaan
 Vishal Dadlani - "Jee Le Zaara" from Talaash
 Ayushmann Khurrana - "Pani Da Rang" from Vicky Donor
 2013 Arijit Singh - "Tum Hi Ho" from Aashiqui 2
 Benny Dayal - "Badtameez Dil" from Yeh Jawaani Hai Deewani
 Ankit Tiwari - "Sunn Raha Hai" from Aashiqui 2
 Siddharth Mahadevan - "Zinda" from Bhaag Milkha Bhaag
 Javed Bashir - "O Rangrez" from Bhaag Milkha Bhaag
 2014 Arijit Singh - "Samjhawan" from Humpty Sharma Ki Dulhania
 Arijit Singh - "Muskurane" from City Lights
 Arijit Singh - "Manwa Laage" from Happy New Year
 Ankit Tiwari - "Galliyan" from Ek Villain
 Vishal Dadlani - "Tu Meri" from Bang Bang!
 2015 Papon - "Moh Moh Ke Dhaage" from Dum Laga Ke Haisha
 Arijit Singh - "Sooraj Dooba Hai" from Roy
 Arijit Singh - "Gerua" from Dilwale
 Arijit Singh - "Aayat" from Bajirao Mastani
 Arijit Singh - "Chunar" from ABCD 2
 2016 Arijit Singh - "Ae Dil Hai Mushkil" from Ae Dil Hai Mushkil
 Arijit Singh - "Channa Mereya" from Ae Dil Hai Mushkil
 Arijit Singh - "Nashe Si Chadh Gayi" from Befikre
 Arijit Singh - "Bolna" from Kapoor & Sons
 Amit Mishra - "Bulleya" from Ae Dil Hai Mushkil
 Rahat Fateh Ali Khan - "Jag Ghoomeya" - Sultan
 2017 Arijit Singh - "Hawayein" from Jab Harry Met Sejal  
 Arijit Singh - "Phir Bhi Tumko Chaahunga" from Half Girlfriend
 Arijit Singh - "Roke Na Ruke Naina" from Badrinath Ki Dulhania
 Ash King - "Baarish" from Half Girlfriend
 Rahat Fateh Ali Khan - "Mere Rashke Qamar" - Baadshaho
 2018 Shivam Pathak - "EK Dil Ek Jaan" from Padmaavat
 Shail Hada & Shivam Pathak - "Khalibali" from Padmaavat 
 Ajay Gogavale - "Dhahdak" from Dhadak
 Arijit Singh - "Binte Dil" from Padmaavat
 Arijit Singh - "Ae Watan" from Raazi
 2019 Arijit Singh - "Kalank" from Kalank
 Arijit Singh - "Tujhe Kitna Chahne Lage" from Kabir Singh
 Ranveer Singh & Divine - "Apna TIme Ayega" from Gully Boy
 B Praak - "Teri Mitti" from Kesari
 Romy, Vivek Hariharan, Shashwat Sachdev - "Challa" from Uri: The Surgical Strike
 2021 Javed Ali - "Srivalli" from Pushpa: The Rise
 Haricharan Seshadri - "Tere Rang" from Atrangi Re
 Arijit Singh - "Tumhein Mohabbat" from Atrangi Re
 Arijit Singh - "Aabaad Barbaad" from Ludo
 Jubin Nautiyal - "Raataan Lambiyan" from Shershaah

See also
 Mirchi Music Awards

References

Mirchi Music Awards